Brestovany is a municipality with about 2000 inhabitants of Trnava District in the Trnava region of Slovakia. The name of the village may be derived from  brest, the Slovak word for elm, a tree which used to be common in the area.

History

Brestovany was first mentioned in a document called Zoborská listina from 1113, where it is referred-to as Bristem. In 1241 the village had to face an invasion of Tatars. Another difficulty came in 1271 when the Czech army conquered Trnava and its surrounding for some time. Brestovany became hereditary property of the town Trnava as of 1280, rendering its inhabitants serfs till the 1848 abolition of serfdom. In 1533 the village was invaded by the Ottoman empire, who plundered and burned it to the ground. In the 18th century the Chapel of Saint Martin and the Church of Saint John the Baptist were built there. In 1811 and 1818 fires seriously destroyed large parts of the village.
As of 1824 Brestovany belonged to Polish count Jozef Saryusz Zamoyski, who had built a neoclassical mansion there, which now houses a primary school. Later it belonged to another Polish noble, Albert Wielopolski. Both noblemen are buried at the local cemetery.

Archaeology 
In July 2022, archaeologists from the Monuments Board of Trnava and the Western Slovakia Museum announced the discovery of a 4,000-year-old female grave. The skeleton was found in a curled position on her left side with jewels from the Early Bronze Age Nitra culture containing two willow-shaped earrings, bone beads, a copper bracelet.

Culture and social life
There are several remarkable historic buildings in Brestovany: the baroque Chapel of Saint Martin (1767), the baroque Church of Saint John the Baptist (1772) and the neoclassical manor house with a large park built in 1826.  The village's organizations include a hunters' association, a carrier-pigeon breeders society, a volunteer fire brigade, a sport club and several choirs.

Notable residents
Ľudmila Zamoyska-Gizická (1829 – 1889)– music composer, pianist

Jožo Nižnánsky (1903 – 1976) – writer, journalist, publicist, author of novel Čachtická pani (1932)

František Nižnánsky (1911- 1967) – Brother of Jožo Nižnánsky, one of founders of modern veterinary science in Slovakia

František Hrušovský (1903 – 1956) – historian, publicist

See also
 List of municipalities and towns in Slovakia

References

Genealogical resources

The records for genealogical research are available at the state archive "Statny Archiv in Bratislava, Slovakia"

 Roman Catholic church records (births/marriages/deaths): 1711-1897 (parish A)
 Lutheran church records (births/marriages/deaths): 1666-1895 (parish B)

External links
Brestovany.sk
Surnames of living people in Brestovany

Villages and municipalities in Trnava District